Abdul Majid Tara Mia (1925–1988) is a Awami League politician and the former Member of Parliament of Mymensingh-20.

Career
Mia was elected to parliament from Mymensingh-20 as an Awami League candidate in 1973.

References

Awami League politicians
1925 births
1988 deaths
1st Jatiya Sangsad members